Japonica is an East Palearctic genus of butterfly in the family Lycaenidae.

Species
 Japonica bella Hsu, 1997.
 Japonica bella lao Koiwaya, 2000 North Laos.
 Japonica bella myanmarensis Koiwaya, 2000 Burma.
 Japonica lutea (Hewitson, 1865) North China and Korea.
 Japonica lutea lutea Japan.
 Japonica lutea adusta (Riley, 1939) Sichuan, East Tibet
 Japonica lutea dubatolovi Fujioka, 1993 Amur Oblast, Ussuri. 
 Japonica lutea gansuensis Murayama, 1991 
 Japonica lutea patungkoanui Murayama, 1956 Taiwan.
 Japonica lutea tatsienluica (Riley, 1939) Szechuan.
 Japonica onoi Murayama, 1953  Japan and Korea.
 Japonica onoi onoi South Ussuri, Japan.
 Japonica onoi mizobei (Saigusa, 1993) Honshu
 Japonica saepestriata (Hewitson, 1865) Northeast China, Korea and Japan.
 Japonica saepestriata saepestriata Ussuri, Japan.
 Japonica saepestriata gotohi Saigusa, 1993 Honshu.
 Japonica saepestriata takenakakazuoi Fujioka, 1993 Central China.

References

External links

images  representing  Japonica  at  Consortium for the Barcode of Life

Theclini
Lycaenidae genera
Taxa named by J. W. Tutt